Derby Friargate railway station was the main station in Derby on the Great Northern Railway Derbyshire Extension, popularly known as the (Derby) Friargate Line.

History 

The line opened on 1 April 1878. The station was on the Derbyshire and Staffordshire extension line, which ran from Burton-upon-Trent to Derby Friargate. Then line continued to Nottingham London Road. The station was closer to the city centre then its counterpart station which is on Midland Road. The station was on Friar Gate, just north of the city.

The station was closed to passengers in 1964 and to freight between Nottingham and Derby in 1967. The site was then taken over by British Rail for test tracking and researching. It used a single line between Friar Gate and the line near Egginton until the 1970s, when it was cut back to nearby Mickleover and the line was lifted. The track was then severed by a new relief road and new builds, and purpose built student accommodation was built on the other side of the old trackbed.

Present day

Friargate Bridge

Today little remains of the station except Andrew Handyside & Co's bridge over Friargate, although the remaining arches attached to the south side of the bridge on the right side reveal a boarded-up arch, the inside of which contains the original staircase to the central island platforms. Now vanished is the canopy that provided passenger access to the station, which was directly adjacent to the boarded-up arch. It is now impossible to access this from below or from the boarded-up recess where the staircase ascended to the platforms.

Station site

It is possible to walk the old station site and to inspect Handyside's bridge, although the crossing has been fenced off for safety reasons.  The old route of the line was towards Mickleover over a steeped bridge taking the line under Uttoxeter Old Road. The main line and sidings are now an industrial estate.

 From here the route approaches the site now occupied by Sainsbury's and there are still some signs of the existence of the old railway, such as a disused bridge over where the line once stood.  Further along and a bridge carrying the old Kingsway part of Derby outer ring road can be observed, although today it only carries a little-used pavement.

Next the line crosses the line of the A38 and climbs through a deep cutting to a summit at Mickleover tunnel. Neither end of the 464-yard tunnel is visible, having been hidden beneath spoil since 1982.  For further information about the route of the line and its history see Derbyshire and Staffordshire extension.

Friargate Bridge restoration
In late 2007 many members of the public and people with local businesses near Friargate railway bridge noticed the poor state of maintenance of the bridge. Several letters appeared in the local paper about this issue.

An online petition was set up to ask the council to restore the bridge. The bridge was sold by British Rail to Derby City Council for £1 in the 1960s, with the provision that the bridge would be maintained in good condition in perpetuity.

Memories of Friargate Station
Published in 1998, the book Memories of Friargate Station by local author Susan Bourne chronicles the station from its early days until its demolition. It also looks at the people who worked there.

Station masters

Alfred Mason 1880–1882
William Goodship 1882–1884 (afterwards station master at Leicester)
Stephen James Sanders 1884 – 1888
W. M. De-Ville 1889 – 1905
F. Worman 1905 – 1922
John Frederick Drury 1922–1932
S. Marsden ca. 1934
Oswald Walker 
Sidney Harold Woodward ???? – 1962

"Underneath the Arches"
The Flanagan and Allen song "Underneath the Arches" may have been influenced by the arches around the bridge. According to a TV programme broadcast in 1957, Bud Flanagan said that he wrote the song in Derby in 1927, and first performed it a week later at the Pier Pavilion, Southport.

References

Notes

Sources
 
 
 Friar Gate Line

Demolished buildings and structures in England
Disused railway stations in Derby
Railway stations in Great Britain opened in 1878
Railway stations in Great Britain closed in 1964
Former Great Northern Railway stations
Beeching closures in England